Benson is an unincorporated community in the town of Anderson, Burnett County, Wisconsin, United States. The community takes its name from Sven Johann Bengston, a local shopkeeper. A post office with the name of Randall was in operation here from 1885 to 1929.

Notes

Unincorporated communities in Burnett County, Wisconsin
Unincorporated communities in Wisconsin